Aliquippa Junior/Senior High School is a public high school in Aliquippa, Pennsylvania.  It is the only high school in the Aliquippa School District. Athletic teams compete as the Aliquippa Quips in the Western Pennsylvania Interscholastic Athletic League (WPIAL).

In 2009, the middle school building that housed grades 5–8 was renovated to house grades 7–12 and the elementary school building that housed grades K-4 was renovated to house grades K-6. The former high school building, built in 1924, was demolished in 2009.

History

20th century
On June 7, 1909, the Woodlawn School District was formed to provide education to the growing population of Woodlawn, which was later annexed into Aliquippa. In 1910, Highland School located in the Plan 6 area of Woodlawn was opened and, in 1911, Logstown School was constructed as well. 

The first high school students were housed in elementary schools or sent to Beaver for senior classes and graduation, in 1913 the first senior class graduated from the Logstown building and whose names are as follows: Lehman Howard, Elvira Davis, Carol Howard, Eleanor Calhoun, Edwin Davis, and Ruth Scott. Shortly after that a two-story building was erected on the foot of the Plan 12 hill and was dedicated as Woodlawn High School. The first graduating class from that school was the Class of 1914 and its members were Dewitt Baker, Rose Eberlie, Helen McGaughy, Alda Johnson, Ruth Stevenson, Orie Cochran, and Joseph Cochran. In 1924, a new high school was erected on the hilltop overlooking the Franklin Avenue Business District. The school consisted of two wings which included 34 classrooms, laboratories, and offices and shortly after that a second building phase followed the construction of a gymnasium and the first part of a vocational shop on the hill above the school was completed. Named Harding High School after the late President Warren G. Harding who died in office during its construction, it was renamed Aliquippa High School on June 8, 1930, due to the merger of the Boroughs of Woodlawn and Aliquippa two years earlier in 1928.

Aliquippa High School continued serving the community for more than 80 years until 2009. At that time the structure was in a state of deterioration and needed either remodeled or replaced. The Aliquippa School District took remodeling the school into consideration, but the project would have cost $63 million and due to the heavy loss of tax revenue because of the closing of the Jones and Laughlin Steel Company in 1985 and the heavy population & school enrollment loss the school could not afford the project. The school decided to cut down from three buildings to two by renovating Aliquippa Elementary School to house Grades K-6 instead of K-4 and renovating Aliquippa Middle School to house Grades 7-12 instead of 5-8 and it was to be renamed Aliquippa Junior/Senior High School . Aliquippa High School would be razed since there was nothing that could be done to the building. The Class of 2009 was the final graduating class from AHS and the Class of 2010 was the first class to graduate from the new Aliquippa Junior/Senior High School. Over 20,000 people graduated from Aliquippa High School from 1925 to 2009.

The Aliquippa Jr/Sr High School was built in 1959 as the Aliquippa Junior High School. The school was built by orders of the Aliquippa Board of School Directors due to the rising enrollment in the District. The school was built from 1958 to 1959 and was built to house 1,000 Students. The school was estimated to cost $750,000 to $850,000. The Junior High School was operated from 1959 to 1985, When by the decision of the Aliquippa School Board, The grades would be realigned, Aliquippa's population was declining due to the collapse of the steel industry, And the school district's enrollment dropped from 3,900 in 1973 to 1,500 that year. The school board decided to put grades Kindergarten through Sixth in the then New Sheffield Elementary School (currently Aliquippa Elementary School), And put grades Seventh through Twelfth Grades at the Aliquippa High school, renaming it Aliquippa Junior/Senior High School, and closing the over 30-year-old Junior High School. This remained until 1991 when due to a spike up in Enrollment, The Aliquippa School Board voted to reopen the Junior High School after being closed for six years. But in order to reopen the Junior High, The building had to be brought up to Code by the Regulations of the Pennsylvania Department of Labor and Department of Education, County of Beaver, and the City of Aliquippa. After the work was finished, the school was dedicated. A new air conditioning system, doors to the classrooms/building, new kitchen equipment, floors, lights, ceiling panels, paint, and a new main school entrance.

21st century
The school was renamed Aliquippa Middle School and operated normally until 2008. After the Aliquippa School Board decided to once again realign the grades, Aliquippa Elementary School now houses kindergarten through sixth grade and Aliquippa Middle School will house grades seven through twelve and was renamed Aliquippa Junior/Senior High School. Aliquippa High School, built in 1924, would be demolished. 

The Class of 2009 was the last graduating class from the former Aliquippa High School. As of the 2019-2020 school year, Aliquippa Junior/Senior High School houses 405 pupils in grades 7 through 12.

Extracurriculars
The school offers clubs, activities and sports. The Aliquippa Quips compete in the AA of the Western Pennsylvania Interscholastic Athletic League.

Aliquippa is the only high school in America with three alumni in the Pro Football Hall of Fame.

Notable alumni
 Press Maravich (class of 1933) – former NCAA basketball coach and father of "Pistol" Pete Maravich
 Henry Mancini (class of 1942) – composer and winner of a record 20 Grammy Awards
 Jesse Steinfeld (class of 1945) –  eleventh Surgeon General of the United States from 1969 to 1973
 Hal Jeter (class of 1963) – former American Basketball Association player with the Washington Caps
 Gust Avrakotos (class of 1955) – United States Central Intelligence Agency operative who received notoriety in George Crile's book Charlie Wilson's War: The Extraordinary Story of the Largest Covert Operation in History
 Mike Ditka (class of 1957) – sports commentator, former National Football League tight end, and former coach of the Chicago Bears and New Orleans Saints; Super Bowl champion as both a player and coach
 Ty Law (class of 1992) – former National Football League cornerback, three-time Super Bowl champion
 Sean Gilbert (class of 1991) – former National Football League defensive tackle
 Darrelle Revis (class of 2003) – National Football League cornerback with the New York Jets and Super Bowl Champion with the New England Patriots
 Tommie Campbell (class of 2005) – National Football League cornerback with the Tennessee Titans
 Jon Baldwin (class of 2008) – former National Football League wide receiver with the San Francisco 49ers

References

External links
 Aliquippa School District

Public high schools in Pennsylvania
Schools in Beaver County, Pennsylvania
Education in Pittsburgh area
1924 establishments in Pennsylvania
Educational institutions established in 1924
Aliquippa, Pennsylvania